Ako priđeš bliže is the second studio album by Zdravko Čolić, released in 1977.

The album remains Čolić's most critically acclaimed album. It polled at the 38th on the list of 100 greatest Yugoslav rock and pop albums in the book YU 100: najbolji albumi jugoslovenske rok i pop muzike (YU 100: The Best Albums of Yugoslav Pop and Rock Music). It was the highest polled album by Čolić on the list.

Track listing

All songs arranged by Kornelije Kovač except for "Juče još", which was arranged by Josip Boček.

Similar songs
The Madonna's song "La Isla Bonita" uses the same chorus melody as the Zdravko Čolić's song "Glavo luda".

References

1978 albums
Zdravko Čolić albums